Jordi Simón (born 6 September 1990) is a Spanish racing cyclist, who last rode for UCI Professional Continental team . He rode at the 2014 UCI Road World Championships. In August 2018, he was named in the startlist for the Vuelta a España.

Major results

2008
 2nd Road race, National Junior Road Championships
2011
 5th Overall Vuelta a la Comunidad de Madrid U23
1st Stage 1
 7th Road race, UEC European Under-23 Road Championships
 9th Overall Tour de l'Avenir
 10th Gran Premio della Liberazione
2013
 1st Overall Vuelta Ciclista a León
1st Stage 1
2014
 Tour des Pays de Savoie
1st  Mountains classification
1st Stages 2 & 3
 1st  Mountains classification Tour de l'Ain
 1st  Points classification Troféu Joaquim Agostinho
 7th Prueba Villafranca de Ordizia
2015
 1st Overall GP Internacional do Guadiana
1st Mountains classification
1st Stage 1
 6th Overall Istrian Spring Trophy
2016
 3rd Road race, National Road Championships
2018
  Combativity award Stage 2 Vuelta a España

Grand Tour general classification results timeline

References

External links

1990 births
Living people
Spanish male cyclists
Cyclists from Catalonia
People from Bages
Sportspeople from the Province of Barcelona
21st-century Spanish people